Trevor James Heath (2 March 1952 – 25 October 2021) was an Australian rules footballer who played with Essendon in the Victorian Football League (VFL). 

In 1970, Heath came runner-up in the Morrish Medal, awarded to the best and fairest player in the VFL under-19s competition. He played his only senior VFL match the next year, 147-point loss to Collingwood. Heath later played for Eastlake in the ACT, West Perth, Subiaco in the West Australian Football League (WAFL), and Wanneroo in the Western Australian Amateur Football League.

Notes

External links 

		
Trevor Heath's playing statistics from WAFL Footy Facts
Essendon Football Club past player profile

		
		
		
	
1952 births
2021 deaths
Australian rules footballers from Victoria (Australia)		
Essendon Football Club players
Essendon District Football League players
Eastlake Football Club players
West Perth Football Club players